The FIFA World Player of the Year award of 1994 was won by the Brazilian striker Romário, while the second place went to the Bulgarian Hristo Stoichkov. Third came Roberto Baggio from Juventus. 
The ceremony took place at the Belem Cultural Centre in Lisbon, on January 30, 1995. 71 national team coaches, based on the current FIFA Men's World Ranking were chosen to vote. It was organised by European Sports Media, Adidas and FIFA.

Results

References

FIFA World Player of the Year
FIFA World Player of the Year